Kedgwin Hoskins (26 May 1777 – 24 December 1852) was a British Whig politician.

Hoskins was elected Whig Member of Parliament for Herefordshire at the 1831 general election, and held the seat until 1847 when he did not seek re-election.

References

External links
 

UK MPs 1831–1832
UK MPs 1832–1835
UK MPs 1835–1837
UK MPs 1837–1841
UK MPs 1841–1847
Whig (British political party) MPs for English constituencies
1777 births
1852 deaths